Wiser may refer to:

 Wireless Information System for Emergency Responders, known as WISER
 Wiser (album), by Halou
 Wiser, Indiana, a small town in the United States
 Women's Institute for Secondary Education and Research (WISER), a non-profit NGO in Muhuru Bay, Kenya
 Women's Institute for Science, Equity and Race (WISER), a nonprofit policy research institute
Wiser's, a Canadian whisky brand